The Pan American Volleyball Complex is an arena in Guadalajara, Mexico.  The arena was opened on March 10, 2007,  built at a cost of 40 million pesos.   It has a capacity of 3,152 and hosted the volleyball competition at the 2011 Pan American Games. This arena was used on the Pan American Games on 2011.

See also
 Volleyball at the 2011 Pan American Games

References

External links
 Profile

2007 establishments in Mexico
Sports venues in Guadalajara, Jalisco
Venues of the 2011 Pan American Games